Carlos Brito may refer to:

Carlos Brito (politician) (born 1933), Portuguese politician
Carlos Brito (businessman) (born 1960), Brazilian CEO of the brewer Anheuser-Busch InBev
Carlos Enrique Brito Benavides (1891–1943), Ecuadorian musician
Carlos Brito (footballer, born 1963), Portuguese football manager
Carlos Correia de Brito, Portuguese deceased footballer